Athanasios Panteliadis (born 6 September 1987) is a Greek professional footballer who plays as a left-back for Super League 2 club Pierikos.

Career

Panteliadis started as an amateur in his hometown team Ethnikos Katerini in which he played in the local league. In 2007, he was signed to Veria. In 2007, he signed a contract with Pierikos. In 2010, he signed with Panserraikos, and he left in 2013 to sign a contract with Apollon Smyrnis. In summer 2014 he signed a 3-year contract with Asteras Tripoli. In summer 2016 he signed a contract with Omonia.

Personal life

Panteliadis has two daughters and he currently lives with his wife and his kids in Tripoli, Greece.

External links
Asterastripolis.gr

1987 births
Living people
Greek footballers
Pierikos F.C. players
Panserraikos F.C. players
Veria F.C. players
Apollon Smyrnis F.C. players
Asteras Tripolis F.C. players
Panionios F.C. players
PAS Lamia 1964 players
AC Omonia players
Super League Greece players
Cypriot First Division players
Association football defenders
Footballers from Katerini